The 1998–99 season was the 101st season of competitive football played by Arsenal. The club, managed by Arsène Wenger, entered the campaign as Premier League and FA Cup double winners. They ended this campaign as league runners-up, a point behind Manchester United, who secured the title on the final day of the season. United also eliminated Arsenal in a FA Cup semi-final replay; Ryan Giggs scored an extra time winner in the 109th minute. Arsenal competed in Europe's premier club competition – the UEFA Champions League – for the first time since its rebrand in 1992, but failed to progress past the group stage.

In the transfer window, Arsenal purchased several players, including Swedish midfielder Freddie Ljungberg and Argentine Nelson Vivas. Ian Wright – the club's all-time top goalscorer, left in the summer to play for West Ham United. Striker Nwankwo Kanu joined Arsenal in January 1999.

Arsenal made an indifferent start to their league campaign with four consecutive draws from their first five matches. After defeat to Aston Villa in December 1998, the team embarked on a 19 match unbeaten run to steadily climb up the league table. A 6–1 win against Middlesbrough in April 1999 moved Arsenal to the top of the table for the first time in the season and victory against Tottenham Hotspur put the team three points clear as main challenger United drew with Liverpool. Both Arsenal and Manchester United went into the final two games of the league season on the same number of points, but the former's defeat to Leeds United all but ended their chances of retaining the title.

30 different players represented Arsenal in five competitions and there were 14 different goalscorers. Arsenal's top goalscorer was Nicolas Anelka, who scored 19 goals in 45 appearances.

Background

In the 1997–98 season, Arsenal participated in the Premier League. The club made several new purchases, notably midfielders Emmanuel Petit and Marc Overmars from AS Monaco and Ajax respectively. Ian Wright scored his 179th and 180th goals for Arsenal against Bolton Wanderers in September 1997 and in the process broke Cliff Bastin's goalscoring record at the club. A run of three defeats in four matches, starting away at Derby County in November, concluded with a 3–1 loss at home to Blackburn Rovers and left the team in sixth place. Although they were 12 points behind league leaders Manchester United by the end of February, a winning streak of nine matches ensured Arsenal won the championship, with a 4–0 win over Everton in May 1998. At Wembley Stadium, Arsenal beat Newcastle United 2–0 in the 1998 FA Cup Final to win the competition and complete a domestic double.

Manager Arsène Wenger was awarded the Carling Manager of the Year award and striker Dennis Bergkamp was given the accolade of PFA Players' Player of the Year by his fellow peers and FWA Footballer of the Year by football writers, in recognition of Arsenal's achievements.

Transfers
David Platt retired from career football at the end of the 1997–98 season. Wright left the club to join West Ham United on a two-year contract in July 1998. Wenger intended to replace him with either striker Patrick Kluivert or winger Thierry Henry, but wages and interest from other clubs proved to be a stumbling block. Defender Nelson Vivas was purchased on a £1.6 million deal to provide cover for Lee Dixon and Nigel Winterburn. Swedish midfielder Freddie Ljungberg joined the club on an undisclosed fee in September 1998, after reported interest from Chelsea. Wenger made the decision to sign him after his performance for the Sweden national football team against England; "I have been aware of Ljungberg for some time but after watching him against England I decided to move for him very quickly." In January 1999, Arsenal completed the signing of striker Nwankwo Kanu.

In

Out

Pre-season and friendlies
To prepare for the upcoming season, Arsenal played a series of friendlies against, firstly, local sides Boreham Wood, Enfield Town and Luton Town, before travelling to Germany for their final pre-season games.

South Asian Tour 
After the end of the season, Arsenal travelled to Asia to play the national sides of both Malaysia and Thailand. After a win against Malaysia, Arsenal suffered a shock loss to the Thai National Football team on 22 May.

FA Charity Shield

Arsenal started the season with a 3–0 win in the Charity Shield against last season's Premier League runners-up Manchester United. Goals came from Overmars in the first half, Christopher Wreh after 61 minutes and Nicolas Anelka 11 minutes after. The result was the first time that a club from Southern England had won the Shield outright since Tottenham Hotspur in 1962.

Premier League

August–October
Arsenal began their defence of the league title against newly promoted team Nottingham Forest on 17 August 1998. A goal by Overmars, eleven minutes from the end gave Arsenal the lead; Geoff Thomas equalised for Nottingham Forest after Petit headed in the opening goal. A goalless draw against Liverpool was followed by successive 0–0 draws, at home to Charlton Athletic and away to Chelsea. Stephen Hughes scored a last minute equaliser at Filbert Street on 12 September 1998 to deny Leicester City a win. After the match, Wenger admitted the club were looking for a new striker to replace Ian Wright, being impressed with Leicester City's goalscorer Emile Heskey: "We will still be buying a striker but unfortunately Leicester do not want to sell Heskey so we will have to go somewhere else … I'm impressed by Heskey. Today he did very well offensively and tried like crazy; too much for me." In Arsenal's next match, at home to Manchester United, goals from Tony Adams, Anelka and Freddie Ljungberg helped the champions inflict a 3–0 defeat; the result was Wenger's third consecutive win over rival manager Alex Ferguson. However, in the following match, Arsenal lost for the first time in the season, against Sheffield Wednesday. Substitute Lee Briscoe scored in the 89th minute, lobbing the ball precisely over goalkeeper Alex Manninger after Sheffield Wednesday striker Paolo Di Canio was sent off for pushing the referee.

On 4 October 1998, Arsenal hosted Newcastle United at Highbury; Dennis Bergkamp scored his first league goal of the season in a 3–0 win. The team failed to convert several chances against Southampton, with the match ending in a 1–1 draw; Anelka and Petit did however score against Blackburn Rovers the following game, thus putting pressure on opposing manager Roy Hodgson as Blackburn remained in the bottom four. The month ended with a 1–0 win away to Coventry City; Anelka scored his fifth league goal of the season, tapping the ball in the net after a counterattack started by Overmars.

November–February

Another 1–0 win, this time at home to Everton was followed by a goalless draw against rivals Tottenham Hotspur. After defeat midweek in the Champions League, Arsenal played Wimbledon at Selhurst Park. Striker Efan Ekoku scored the winning goal to condemn Arsenal to a second successive loss; Patrick Vieira sustained a hamstring injury in the match. Two more draws, against Middlesbrough and Derby County left Arsenal in fourth position but Wenger took comfort in the latter match, praising Steve Bould and David Seaman: "the real symbols of spirit." They faced league leaders Aston Villa on 13 December 1998, and having taken a 2–0 lead, through two goals scored by Bergkamp, had in unprecedented circumstances conceded three goals in the second half to lose the match. Arsenal responded to their third defeat of the season by putting a run together of three consecutive wins during the Christmas period – starting against Leeds United, followed by West Ham United and finally Charlton Athletic. The team ended the calendar year in fourth position, two points behind Chelsea.

On 9 January 1999, Arsenal were held to a stalemate by Liverpool; Wenger, commenting on the performance was disappointed about Liverpool's approach, adding: "Usually we create chances and don't score, but today we just didn't create chances." A headed goal by Martin Keown, from a Petit corner earned Arsenal a 1–0 win the following week, away to Nottingham Forest. Against Chelsea on the final day of January, Arsenal won 1–0 at Highbury to end the visitors 21-game unbeaten run in the Premier League. Wenger hailed the performance, saying "I knew my players were ready. After a few years you just know. It's like working for the weather forecast: you have a feeling whether it will rain or not."

An inspired performance by Bergkamp helped Arsenal win 0–4 at West Ham United in the first weekend of February. He, however missed the following match, away to Manchester United, due to suspension along with Petit; Keown was absent due to a hamstring injury. Arsenal conceded a first half penalty when Ray Parlour brought down Ronny Johnsen. Dwight Yorke missed, chipping the ball wide of the right-hand post, and was made to pay early in the second half as new signing Nwankwo Kanu's through ball found striker Anelka, who scored. Andy Cole equalised moments after – Arsenal's first goal conceded in two months, and with both teams spurring chances to win the match, it ended in a 1–1 draw. Three days after, Anelka scored his first career hat-trick against Leicester City. Bergkamp after the match felt Arsenal were now equipped to push on for a title challenge, like last season: "It's all coming back. I feel it, for myself and for the team." A draw at Newcastle left the team three points behind Chelsea, in third position.

March–May
Arsenal moved into second place with a 3–0 win over Sheffield Wednesday on 9 March 1999. A brace from Bergkamp and a debut goal scored by Kanu – dumming the goalkeeper inside the penalty box and shooting past the middle of the net, meant the club now picked up 27 points out of a possible last 33. A 2–0 win against Everton was followed by another 2–0 win, at home to Coventry City. Arsenal drew 0–0 with Southampton on 3 April 1999, which left the team four points behind league leaders Manchester United. A 1–0 victory against Blackburn Rovers three days later, helped them move a point behind first position. The team scored five goals against Wimbledon and hit Middlesbrough for six the following week; Kanu's first goal, Arsenal's third was described as an "illustration of the African's deceptive subtlety," side-stepping defender Dean Gordon before stroking the ball past the net. The result moved Arsenal to the top of the table for the first time in the season, albeit having played a match more than Manchester United.

In May Arsenal beat Derby County 1–0 to return to first spot, after Manchester United recorded three points against Aston Villa. A 3–1 away win against Tottenham Hotspur moved them three points clear after Paul Ince scored a late equaliser for Liverpool against Manchester United. Wenger was adamant that Ferguson's team were marginal favourites, but it was evident the title race would be decided on the final day, akin to 1995. Jimmy Floyd Hasselbaink's late winner for Leeds United against Arsenal two days later all but ended their chances of retaining the league championship. Although Manchester United drew their penultimate match away to Blackburn Rovers, they eventually secured the title with a 2–1 victory at home to Tottenham Hotspur; a second half goal scored by Kanu against Aston Villa on the final day ensured Arsenal finished a point behind, in second place.

Match results

Classification

FA Cup

As holders and participants of the top division, Arsenal entered the FA Cup in the third round, in which they were drawn to play Preston North End of the Second Division. Despite being 2–0 down in the first half, Arsenal came back to win the match 4–2 at Deepdale. In the fourth round, Arsenal played Wolverhampton Wanderers – a repeat of last year's semi-final. Goals from Overmars and Bergkamp helped Arsenal win 2–1; the match was overshadowed by the sending off of midfielder Petit. A fifth round tie against Sheffield United was replayed on 23 February 1999 at the suggestion of Wenger. The winning goal, scored by Overmars came from failure to return the ball to the opposition, in order to get defender Lee Morris off the pitch. Arsenal went on to win the replay 2–1 and a 1–0 victory against Derby County meant the team reached the semi-finals for the second consecutive season.

Arsenal played league challengers Manchester United on 11 April 1999. Neither team was able to score even after extra time had been played, therefore the match was decided in a replay four days later. David Beckham opened the scoring for United from a long range shot, but Bergkamp equalised with a shot that deflected off United's centre back Jaap Stam. United captain Roy Keane was red-carded for two bookable offences, with his team playing the last thirty minutes of normal time a man down. In injury time, Phil Neville fouled Parlour in the penalty area, conceding a penalty. Peter Schmeichel parried away Bergkamp's resultant spot kick and the game went into extra time. Giggs scored partway through the second half of extra time. Picking up possession on the halfway line after a loose pass from Patrick Vieira, he dribbled past the entire Arsenal back line before shooting just under Seaman's bar. Giggs ran celebrating towards the United fans, and the team held on win 2–1. The goal was the last ever scored in a FA Cup semi-final replay; it was to be abolished from the following season.

League Cup

In the third round of the League Cup, Arsenal faced Derby County at Pride Park. Wenger made several first team changes to give his younger players playing time; Arsenal ran out 2–1 winners, a performance where "every touch by a Derby player was greeted with ironic cheers." However, the team were beaten comprehensively in the next round to Chelsea at Highbury, losing 0–5. The result inflicted Arsenal's biggest defeat in over eight years and Wenger defended his team selection, virtually a 'second team': "I knew before the game that this kind of thing might happen. You only had to look at the team sheets. If we had won I would still have gone on playing the same side because the players need the experience." Bergkamp, who was rested for the match, echoed his manager's comments: "We had a lot of young players on the field against Chelsea and, although they were feeling very down after losing like that, they will learn from it. To be honest, the scoreline doesn't mean anything, whether it was 1–0 or 5–0. The supporters will feel bad but I hope they understand Saturday will be a different game [at home to Tottenham Hotspur]."

UEFA Champions League

Group stage

Winning the Premier League the previous season ensured Arsenal's qualification into the UEFA Champions League. They last participated in Europe's premier competition seven years ago, losing to Portuguese club Benfica, in the second round; the competition since was rebranded. In order to boost attendance figures, Arsenal was granted permission by UEFA and the Football Association to host their home Champions League matches at Wembley Stadium. A Wembley spokesman added "We would be delighted for Arsenal to use the stadium. It makes financial sense."

The club were drawn in Group E, along with French champions Lens, Ukraine's Dynamo Kyiv and Panathinaikos of Greece. In the opening match against Lens, Arsenal conceded a late equaliser having dominated possession and chances. A win against Panathinaikos was followed by a draw at home to Dynamo Kyiv; Serhii Rebrov scoring the equaliser in stoppage time. In the reverse fixture, Arsenal – depleted due to injuries, lost 3–1 and a further defeat, at home to Lens meant the team effectively were out of the competition. An understrength Arsenal team won their final group game away to Panathinaikos but finished third in Group B; Wenger asserted after the match that his main aim was to retain the Premier League, going further to describe the group as "very average".

Player statistics
Arsenal used a total of 30 players during the 1998–99 season and there were 14 different goalscorers. There were also three squad members who did not make a first-team appearance in the campaign. Overmars featured in 49 matches – the most of any Arsenal player in the campaign. Vivas made the most appearances as a substitute with 18.

The team scored a total of 82 goals in all competitions. The highest scorer was Anelka, with 19 goals, followed by Bergkamp who scored 16 goals. Three Arsenal players were sent off during the season: Dixon, Keown and Petit (twice).
Key

No. = Squad number

Pos = Playing position

Nat. = Nationality

Apps = Appearances

GK = Goalkeeper

DF = Defender

MF = Midfielder

FW = Forward

 = Yellow cards

 = Red cards

Numbers in parentheses denote appearances as substitute. Players with number struck through and marked  left the club during the playing season.

Source:

See also
 1998–99 in English football
 List of Arsenal F.C. seasons

References

Arsenal
Arsenal F.C. seasons